Yury Kronn (April 22, 1935 -), was formerly a Soviet radio-physicist, and is now an American citizen and academic. He is known for developing a theory of resonant non-linear interaction of light with matter, which was the basis for a physics text book, Resonant Nonlinear Interactions of Light with Matter.

In 1982, Kronn and ten other Russian dissidents organized a movement to foster trust and promote peace between the Soviet Union and the West.  Kronn chaired the Disarmament Section of the first Moscow International Symposium for Humanitarian Problems in 1987.

In 2013, Kronn was appointed a faculty member of Quantum University in Honolulu, Hawaii, a school that is not accredited in the United States.

Soviet dissident activities 
In June 1982, with ten other dissidents, Kronn helped organize the Group to Establish Trust Between the U.S. and the USSR, a non-official movement for trust and peace between the Soviet Union and the West.

The Trust Group avoided criticizing their own government's policies, both because they believed that criticism would generate opposition, and because it was illegal to do so. Instead, they suggested ways to improve relations between the superpowers based on the belief that improved trust could slow or stop the arms race. Their proposals included ideas for conversion of the military-industrial complexes on both sides by shifting to joint work on peaceful, humanitarian projects.

As a result of these and other actions, Soviet authorities applied pressure on Kronn. New York Times Moscow correspondent John F. Burns reported that Kronn, then known as Yury Khronopulo, had been warned at the institute where he was employed that he faced dismissal and possible prosecution for treason if his dissident activities continued.

In the summer of 1982, while an international peace march was taking place in Moscow, assault charges were fabricated against Kronn and an associate, Yuri V. Medvedkov. The two were arrested on July 16 and held in prison by the Soviet security department, the KGB, until July 31, 1982. Despite attempts to silence him, Kronn persisted with his unsanctioned political activities. In 1987 he chaired the Disarmament Section of the first Moscow International Symposium for Humanitarian Problems.

Patents 
Five patents have been granted to Kronn; four in the Soviet Union and one in the US: 
 Method of Obtaining Holograms, USSR Patent No. 508142, (1975)
 Method of Transformation and Intensification of an Object's Image, USSR Patent No. 533254, (1976)
 A Method of Amplifying Superpower Laser Impulses, USSR Patent No. 2768756 (1979)
 A Method of Obtaining Light Impulses with a Steep Front, USSR Patent No.2876505 (1980)

References 

Vital Force Technology
Khronopulo, Y.G., Butylkin, V.S., Kaplan, A.E., Yakubovich, E.I., Translated by Germogenova, O. A., Resonant Nonlinear Interactions of Light with Matter, New York: Springer-Verlag, 1989, .
Khronopulo, Y.G.: Spatially-Bounded Phase Capture and Axial Anti-Stokes Radiation in SRS in Gases. Journal of Experimental and Theoretical Physics (JETP) Letters, Vol.17, (1973), p. 285. 
Khronopulo, Y.G.: Theory of Resonant Four-Photon Interactions. Soviet Physics, Journal of Experimental and Theoretical Physics (JETP), Vol. 41, (1975), p. 247. 
Khronopulo, Y.G.: Influence of Parametric Processes on the Generation of Stokes Components of SRS Under Bi-harmonic Pumping. Journal of Experimental and Theoretical Physics (JETP) Letters, Vol.21, (1975). p. 105. 
Khronopulo, Y.G.: Frequency Transformation in Four-Photon Resonant Parametric Interactions Based on SRS. Soviet Journal of Quantum Electronics, Vol.5, (1975), p. 917.

Nahaylo, Bohdan, (The Spectator) (December 20, 1983). "Soviet peace group survives despite all the odds". Sydney Morning Herald.

External links 
Springer-Verlag academic publishing website
Quantum University website: iquim.org 
Commission on Security and Cooperation in Europe - US Helsinki Commission website 
Arch Patents website
Washington Post Archive Search
Wilson Center Digital Archive

Soviet scientists
1935 births
Living people
American scientists